Red Rocks Country Club is a private golf and country club located in Jefferson County, just outside Morrison, Colorado in the foothills of the Rocky Mountains. Challenging course with beautiful views of surrounding foothills and downtown Denver exist from the golf course, clubhouse and restaurant patio.

External links 

Golf clubs and courses in Colorado
Buildings and structures in Jefferson County, Colorado